Edjudina Station is a pastoral lease within the Edjudina Land District of Western Australia, that operates as a sheep station. The leasehold shares a boundary with Yundamindera Station. 

Edjudina Consolidated Gold Mines Ltd commenced operations in 1937, but closed down shortly after due to declining market conditions for gold.

The traditional owners of the area are the Wongatha and Maduwongga peoples.

The lease was established in 1892 by Watt Newland. It was one of the first pastoral leases in the goldfields; the property was stocked with sheep. It was acquired by the Wilkie brothers at a "highly satisfactory price". The Wilkies later sold to James Withnell for £21,000. The property was then acquired by the famed sheep breeder, Edward Hawker, in 1925. Hawker paid £49,000, a record price in the east Murchison. The property was stocked with 7,000 sheep and 1,200 cattle at the time.

By 1934 the station was stocked with about 25,000 sheep and was still owned by E. W. Hawker and sons. In 1948 the station was stocked with 12,500 sheep.

In 2012 the property received  of rain in 24 hours, its highest rainfall in 11 years, when the remnants of Cyclone Lua passed over the area.

See also
List of ranches and stations
List of pastoral leases in Western Australia

References

Homesteads in Western Australia
Pastoral leases in Western Australia
Stations (Australian agriculture)
Goldfields-Esperance